Avonsleigh is a town in Victoria, Australia, 47 km east of Melbourne's central business district, located within the Shire of Cardinia local government area. Avonsleigh recorded a population of 844 at the 2021 census.

History
The Post Office opened as Koenig's in 1902, was renamed Avonsleigh in 1911 and closed in 1985. It was named after the Avonsleigh guest house owned by J.W. Wright.

See also
 Shire of Sherbrooke – Avonsleigh was previously within this former local government area.

References

External links
Australian Places - Avonsleigh

Shire of Cardinia